Un Día Más (English: One More Day) is the third studio album from Mexican Latin pop group Reik, released on 30 September 2008 through Sony BMG. The album features the singles "Inolvidable" and "Fui". The album won the 2009 Latin Grammy award for Best Pop Album by a Duo/Group with Vocals.

Track listing
"Ilusionado" (Hopeful)
"Piel De Ciudad" (City Skin)
"Fui" (I Was)
"Inolvidable" (Unforgettable)
"No Me Hables Del Ayer" (Don't Talk To Me About Yesterday)
"No Hay Nadie Más" (There Is No One Else)
"No Desaparecerá" (It Will Not Disappear)
"Voy A Estar" (I'm Going To Be)
"Vuelve A Mí" (Return To Me)
"Un Día Más (One More Day)

Bonus track
"Momentos" (Moments)
"Fui (Acústica)" (I Was (Acoustic))

Charts

Weekly charts

Year-end charts

Sales and certifications

References

2008 albums
Albums produced by Cachorro López
Latin Grammy Award for Best Pop Album by a Duo or Group with Vocals
Reik albums
Sony BMG Norte albums